Bill Champion may refer to:

Bill Champion (baseball) (1947–2017), American Major League Baseball player
Bill Champion (racing driver) (1921–1991), American stock car racing driver
Bill Champion (actor), British actor in Rockliffe's Babies

See also
William Champion (disambiguation)